Lücke, Luecke, or Lucke, is a surname. Notable people with the surname include:

Bernd Lucke (born 1962), German economist and politician (AfD)
Georg Albert Lücke (1829–1894), German surgeon
Gottfried Christian Friedrich Lücke (1791–1855), German theologian
Hannfried Lucke (born 1964), German organist
Heinz Lucke (born 1953), West German canoer
John Edwin Luecke, American mathematician
John F. Luecke (1889–1952), American politician from Michigan
Jörg Lucke (born 1942), East German rower
Paul Lücke (1914–1976), German politician (CDU)
Steve Luecke, American politician from Indiana

Surnames from given names